Neil Alexander Hundt is the bass guitarist for Arthur, a side project of MxPx. Hundt is credited with being the drum technician for Yuri Ruley on MxPx album The Everpassing Moment. A year later, in 2001, he provided vocals for the songs "Party II," "Time Will Tell," and "Yuri Wakes Up Screaming" on The Renaissance EP.

References

External links

American bass guitarists
Living people
Year of birth missing (living people)